Style Savvy, known as Nintendo presents: Style Boutique in the PAL region and as  in Japan, is a fashion video game developed by Syn Sophia and published by Nintendo. It was released for the Nintendo DS on October 23, 2008 in Japan, on October 23, 2009 in Europe, and November 2, 2009 in North America. The game is followed up by three sequels for the Nintendo 3DS called Style Savvy: Trendsetters, Style Savvy: Fashion Forward, and Style Savvy: Styling Star.

Gameplay
Style Savvy is played by holding the DS sideways, and the game utilizes the clock and date settings on the system. There are 8 locations where the player can buy clothes, accessories, change hair styles, change outfits, and work on their shop by managing items, making ads, and more. In the contest they can compete and stand a chance to win a rare item.

Using the DS Wireless play, players can also visit other players' shops, trade flyers after the Ads and Flyers option is unlocked, or take part in the contest with up to 3 other players. The Nintendo Wi-Fi Connection allowed players to open their own shop and let other people visit it. They could even download items that are not available during gameplay.

Characters

The owner of the character's shop. He is the only male character along with Godfrey. He is rich and is able to upgrade the player's shop.

She is the players' employer at the start of the game and works with her in Dominic's shop ("Strata" in the North American version and "Primavera" in the European version). Once the player owns their own boutique, she is able to give them advice.

An employee at the start of the game in Strata, she later works in the player's boutique.

Photographer/paparazzi. She'll take pictures of your character after winning a fashion contest or when on an outing. She is stated in the NA version to be Roccoco's niece.

At the top of the fashion ladder, she also hosts the fashion contests.
Felicity
Editor of the nuances magazine. Interviews the character when she wins a fashion contest (only once a month).

Dominic's maid. She will visit the player's shop if their character wears the exact clothes she does.

She owns the hair salon and is able to change the player character's hair. Will visit the player's shop and wear the purchased outfit in her salon.

She owns the beauty salon, where makeup can be purchased and eyebrows styled. Will visit the player's shop and wear the purchased outfit in her salon.

Reception 

Style Savvy received "mixed or average reviews" according to Metacritic.

Notes

References

External links
Style Savvy at Nintendo.com
Style Boutique at Nintendo.co.uk
 Wagamama Fashion: Girls Mode at Nintendo.co.jp

2008 video games
Dress-up video games
Nintendo franchises
Nintendo games
Nintendo DS games
Nintendo Wi-Fi Connection games
Simulation video games
Syn Sophia games
Video games developed in Japan
Video games scored by Atsuhiro Motoyama
Casual games
Virtual Console games for Wii U
Single-player video games